Giovanni Pontiero (10 February 1932 – 10 February 1996) was a Scots-Italian scholar and translator of Portuguese fiction. Most notably, he translated the works of José Saramago and Clarice Lispector, two celebrated names in Portuguese-language literature.

Life 
Born and raised in Glasgow, after secondary school Pontiero went into seminary at Biggar and later at Rimini, Italy, but at age 24 decided to abdicate from a religious career. He graduated from the university of Glasgow in 1960 and completed his PhD while in Brazil at Universidade Federal de Paraíba, returning to Manchester to defend his thesis on Manuel Bandeira. In 1962 he was appointed lecturer in Latin American studies at Manchester. He was later promoted to senior lecturer and finally Reader in Latin-American Literature in the Victoria University of Manchester until his retirement in 1995. Ponteiro had a lifelong interest in the theatre, in particular the work of the great Italian actress Eleonora Duse (1858–1924). He translated, edited and wrote the introduction of Duse on Tour: The Diaries of Guido Noccioli 1906–1907 (Manchester University Press, 1981), and later went on to write a biography of Duse, Eleonora Duse: In Life and Art (Verlag Peter Lang, 1986). His collection of over 1,000 items relating to Duse was bequeathed to the  Glasgow University Library in 1996.

Work 
Holding an academic position and translating, he not only gave students advice, but wrote about the translating profession. He was the principal translator into English of the works of both Saramago and Clarice Lispector, and met early acclaim for his translation of Lispector's short story "Amor", winning the Camões Prize for Translation in 1968. In 1993 he won The Independents Foreign Fiction Award for the translation of Saramago's The Year of the Death of Ricardo Reis and the Outstanding Translation Award from the American Literary Translator's Association for the same author's The Gospel According to Jesus Christ the following year; later receiving the Texeira-Gomes Prize for this same translation. He was amongst those to note Pandeism to be an influence on the writings of noted mid-twentieth-century Brazilian poet Carlos Nejar.

Pontiero's papers are held by the John Rylands Library, University of Manchester.

Notable translations into English (publication dates for original followed by translation)

José Saramago 

 Baltasar and Blimunda, 1982, 1987
 The Year of the Death of Ricardo Reis, 1984, 1991
 The Gospel According to Jesus Christ, 1991, 1994
 The Stone Raft, 1986, 1994
 Manual of Painting and Calligraphy, 1977, 1995
 The History of the Siege of Lisbon, 1989, 1996
 Blindness, 1995, 1997
 The Lives of Things, 1978, 2012

Clarice Lispector 

 Family Ties, 1960, 1984
 The Foreign Legion, 1964, 1986
 Near to the Wild Heart, 1943, 1990 (2012)
 The Hour of the Star, 1977, 1992
 Selected Cronicas, 1967–1973, 1996
 Discovering the World, 1997

References 

1932 births
1996 deaths
Latin Americanists
Translators from Portuguese
Translators of Clarice Lispector
20th-century British translators